St. Giuseppe Moscati: Doctor to the Poor is a 2007 Italian television movie written and directed by Giacomo Campiotti. The film is based on real life events of doctor and then  Roman Catholic Saint Giuseppe Moscati.

Plot 
Upon graduation from medical school, an idealistic young doctor starts working in a hospital, in impoverished 1906 Naples. He quickly comes to the conclusion that the practice of medicine, especially when involving poor patients, needs a lot more compassion. He finds himself devoting his life to helping those in need, especially the destitute, with his skills and empathy.

When a beautiful princess becomes infatuated with him, the challenge arises on how to make room for a relationship in a life that is first and foremost devoted to public service.

The doctor's life story, followed through the rise of fascism a couple of decades later, is contrasted with the different life path followed by a friend of his with whom he had completed medical school.

Cast 

 Giuseppe Fiorello as Giuseppe Moscati
 Ettore Bassi as Giorgio Piromallo
 Kasia Smutniak as  Elena Cajafa
  Paola Casella as  Cloe
  Emanuela Grimalda as  Sister Helga
 Giorgio Colangeli as Professor De Lillo
  Antonella Stefanucci as  Nina Moscati
  Carmine Borrino as  Umberto

References

External links

2007 television films
2007 films
Italian television films
2007 biographical drama films
Films set in Italy
Italian biographical drama films
Films about religion
Films directed by Giacomo Campiotti
2007 drama films
2000s Italian films